The Aero A.20 was a biplane fighter aircraft built in Czechoslovakia in 1923. It was evaluated for Czechoslovak Air Force service against Aero's competing A.18 and A.19 designs, a competition that the A.18 won, meaning that this aircraft never entered production, and only a single prototype was ever built.

Specifications (A.20)

See also

References

A020
Single-engined tractor aircraft
Biplanes
1920s Czechoslovakian fighter aircraft